The Women's Super G competition of the Calgary 1988 Olympics was held at Nakiska on Monday, February 22. This was the Olympic debut of the event.

The defending world champion was Maria Walliser of Switzerland, who was also the defending World Cup Super G champion, while Michela Figini led the current season.

Austria's Sigrid Wolf won the gold medal, Figini took the silver, and Karen Percy of Canada was the bronze medalist; Walliser was sixth.

Results
The race was started at 11:37 local time, (UTC −7).

References

External links
FIS results

Women's Super G
Alp
Oly